WAGF-FM (101.3 FM, "101.3 The Touch") is a radio station broadcasting an Urban Adult Contemporary music format. Licensed to Dothan, Alabama, United States, the station is currently owned by Wilson Broadcasting Co., Inc.

WAGF-FM features programming from ABC Radio. Notable programming on the station includes the Tom Joyner Morning Show and Mel Devon's Late Night Love Music. In addition to its music programming, WAGF-FM is also the University of Alabama Crimson Tide sports affiliate, which consists of football, basketball, baseball, and Tide Talk.

References

External links

Urban adult contemporary radio stations in the United States
Gospel radio stations in the United States
AGF-FM
Radio stations established in 1991
1991 establishments in Alabama